Adam Anderson (born 21 December 1969) is an Australian former professional tennis player.

A left-handed player from Sydney, Anderson was an Australian Institute of Sport scholarship holder and competed on the professional tour in the late 1980s. He featured in the main draw of the 1988 and 1989 editions of the Australian Open.

Anderson, along with wife Carol, appeared in series six of the reality cooking show My Kitchen Rules in 2015.

References

External links
 
 

1969 births
Living people
Australian male tennis players
Tennis players from Sydney
Australian Institute of Sport tennis players
Participants in Australian reality television series
20th-century Australian people